Shanghai Auto Museum is an automobile museum located in Anting, Jiading District, Shanghai, China, in the Auto Expo Park of Shanghai International Automobile City. Designed by the Architectural Design & Research Institute of Tongji University and IFB from Germany, the museum opened to the public on January 17, 2007.

The museum is the first specialist museum of its kind in China. The museum houses a collection of over 100 classic automobiles, representing nearly 50 brands from China and abroad, spanning 100 years of automobile history and development. 
The History Pavilion houses 27 cars representing milestones in automotive development. The Antique Car Pavilion contains 40 cars from 20 different manufacturers dating between 1900 and 1970. The Chinese and foreign car models on display include Fords, Fiat 500, Austin 7, Rover P5, Jaguar E-Type and a GM EV1.

See also
List of automobile museums

References

External links

Shanghai Auto Museum website 
Shanghai Auto Museum website 
Shanghai Automobile website 

Museums established in 2007
2007 establishments in China
Automobile museums in China
Museums in Shanghai
Transport museums in China
Transport in Shanghai